Nam Kyung-pil (born 20 January 1965) is a South Korean politician who served as the 34th governor of Gyeonggi Province from 2014 to 2018. Before his election, he had been a member of the National Assembly since 1998, representing Paldal-gu. In 2016, he left the Saenuri Party because of President Park Geun-hye's scandal. He helped establish the  new Bareun Party with other conservative politicians who left Saenuri.

National Assembly
On 21 July 1998, there was a by-election in Paldal-gu to replace former member Kim Yong-nam who died on 13 March 1998. Nam won the by-election with 21,356 votes. He had represented Paldal-gu until 15 May 2014, weeks before the gubernatorial election.

2017 presidential election
On 25 January 2017, Nam declared that he would run for the president of South Korea in 2017. Nam's major commitment was to change South Korea's military conscription service to volunteer military system. He was defeated in his party's primary by his sole opponent, Yoo Seong-min MP.

References

1961 births
Living people
Bareun Party politicians
Governors of Gyeonggi Province
Members of the National Assembly (South Korea)
People from Yongin
Yale School of Management alumni
Yonsei University alumni
Uiryeong Nam clan